Lu Chuan (born 8 February 1971) is a Chinese filmmaker, screenwriter and producer. He is the son of novelist Lu Tianming.

Education
After his time in the army, Lu attended the Beijing Film Academy for a master's degree in directing. While there, he studied the works of his favorite directors including Ingmar Bergman, Jim Jarmusch, and Pier Paolo Pasolini. His dissertation was on the American filmmaker Francis Ford Coppola.

Directorial career
Hailed as a major new voice in Chinese cinema, Lu's first two films were small-budget productions which garnered both Chinese and international acclaim: 2002's The Missing Gun and 2004's Kekexili: Mountain Patrol. Kekexili won a Golden Rooster and a Golden Horse best picture award and Special Jury Prize at the 17th Tokyo International Film Festival.

Lu's third film, the war drama City of Life and Death, was released in April 2009 to both critical and commercial success. At the same time, however, the film's sympathetic portrayal of a Japanese soldier aroused controversy.  Lu Chuan won Achievement in Directing for the film at 3rd Asia Pacific Screen Awards and Best Director Award at 4th Asian Film Awards. The film won Best Film and Best Cinematography Awards at 57th San Sebastian Film Festival.

Lu's historical film The Last Supper was released in 2012.

Filmography

References

External links
 
 
 Lu Chuan at the Chinese Movie Database

Film directors from Xinjiang
Beijing Film Academy alumni
1970 births
Living people
Screenwriters from Xinjiang
People from Ili
Best Director Asian Film Award winners
Asia Pacific Screen Award winners